Rajaram or Raja Ram is one of the Indian names:

 Several Chhatrapatis, leaders of the Maratha Empire in India
 Rajaram I (1670–1700), younger son of Maratha ruler Chhatrapati Shivaji, ruled 1689–1700
 Rajaram II of Satara, putative grandson of Rajaram Chhatrapati, ruled 1749–1777
 Rajaram II (1850–1870), Raja of Kolhapur 1866–1870
 Rajaram III (1897–1940), Maharaja of Kolhapur 1922–1940
 Rajaram College in Kolhapur, named after the Maratha King
 Rajaram Godase (born 1961), Indian politician
 Rajaram of Sinsini (ruled 1670–1688), Jat leader and organizer of rebellion against Aurangzeb
 Rajaram (politician), Indian politician from Uttar Pradesh
 Madhurantakam Rajaram (1930–1999), Indian story writer
 Raja Ram Mohan Roy, a founder of the Brahmo Samaj, an Indian socio-religious reform movement
 Raja Ram (musician) (born Ronald Rothfield 1941), musician and the owner of the UK record label TIP World
 N. S. Rajaram (1943–2019), 21st century author and mathematician
 Ramaswamy Rajaram, Indian Air Force Air Marshal